Aseer Ahsan (in Arabic أصير أحسن) is a 2015 album by Humood AlKhudher, released on Awakening Records. Just after being released, the album made the top selling list in iTunes Gulf and saved its 10th place in the Billboard for the World Music Albums.

Music videos
 Humood's debut track from the item titled "Kun Anta" (in Arabic كن أنت) was launched accompanied by a music video and made a wide success exceeding 200 million views on YouTube and was top selling release on iTunes Malaysia. A special Indonesian version of the song was also released.
The follow-up single from the album was "Ha Anatha" (in Arabic هأنذا) also accompanied by a music video.

Track list

2015 albums